Sardar Balbir Singh Kullar (8 August 1942 – 28 February 2020) was an Indian field hockey player and a Punjab Police officer. Alternative spellings of his last name include Khullar.

Balbir Singh was born in the Sansarpur village of the Jalandhar district. He was the captain of the All India Schools during 1957–1960, and also played as part of the Combined University Team. At the national-level, he represented the hockey teams of Punjab State, Indian Railways and Punjab Police. For a brief time, he also played for the little-known hockey team of Mohun Bagan. Balbir Singh joined the Punjab Armed Police in 1962, and became an Assistant Sub-Inspector of the Punjab Police in 1963.

As part of the Indian national men's hockey team, he played his first international game in 1963 at Lyons in France. He gained reputation as an inside forward in the Indian team, and toured Belgium, East Africa, East Germany, England, the Netherlands, Italy, Kenya, New Zealand and West Germany. He was a member of the Indian team that won the Olympic Gold in 1964 (Tokyo), Asian Games Gold in 1966 (Bangkok) and the Olympic Bronze in 1968 (Mexico).

During 1968–1975, Balbir Singh was a part of the All India Police team, and also served as its captain for some time. He became the Deputy Superintendent of Police in 1981, became an Indian Police Service officer in 1987. He retired as a Deputy Inspector General (DIG) in February 2001.

He died at his home in Sansarpur at the age of 77.

Awards 
 Padma Shri (2009)
 Arjuna Award (1999)

References

External links

1942 births
2020 deaths
Olympic gold medalists for India
Olympic field hockey players of India
Olympic medalists in field hockey
Field hockey players at the 1964 Summer Olympics
Field hockey players at the 1968 Summer Olympics
Indian male field hockey players
Indian police officers
Recipients of the Arjuna Award
Recipients of the Padma Shri in sports
People from Jalandhar district
Asian Games medalists in field hockey
Field hockey players at the 1966 Asian Games
Field hockey players from Jalandhar
Medalists at the 1964 Summer Olympics
Medalists at the 1968 Summer Olympics
Asian Games gold medalists for India
Olympic bronze medalists for India
Medalists at the 1966 Asian Games